Menecrates of Syracuse was the physician at the court of Philip of Macedon, 359–336 BC. He seems to have been a successful practitioner, but to have made himself ridiculous by calling himself Zeus, and assuming divine honors. He would give the names of various gods to those he successfully treated. He once wrote a letter to Philip, beginning : 
 
He was invited one day by Philip to a magnificent entertainment, where the other guests were sumptuously fed, while he himself had nothing but incense and libations, as not being subject to the human infirmity of hunger. He was at first pleased with his reception, but afterwards, perceiving the joke and finding that no more substantial food was offered him, he left the party in disgust.

See also	 	
Athenaeus  vii.289

References

 O. Weinreich, Menekrates Zeus und Salmoneus, Religionsgeschichtliche Studien zur Psychopathologie des Gottmenschentums in Antike und früher Neuzeit. Tüb. Beitr. zur Altertumswissenschaft 18 (Stuttgart 1933)

4th-century BC Greek physicians
Ancient Syracusans
Courtiers of Philip II of Macedon